Navarretia pubescens is a species of flowering plant in the phlox family known by the common name downy pincushionplant.

It is native to the central mountain ranges and Central Valley of California, and to southern Oregon. It can be found in chaparral and oak woodlands habitats.

Description
Navarretia pubescens is a hairy, glandular annual herb producing a reddish or brownish stem up to about 33 centimeters in maximum length. The leaves are divided into many linear or needlelike lobes, sometimes clustered. The upper leaves are hairy, the lower generally hairless.

The inflorescence is a cluster of many flowers surrounded by leaflike bracts and coated with downy or glandular hairs. Each flower is just over a centimeter long and blue in color with a purplish throat.

External links
Jepson Manual Treatment
Photo gallery

pubescens
Flora of California
Flora of Oregon
Flora of the Sierra Nevada (United States)
Natural history of the California chaparral and woodlands
Natural history of the California Coast Ranges
Natural history of the Central Valley (California)
Plants described in 1839
Flora without expected TNC conservation status